Freddy Superlano Salinas (born 25 June 1976) is a Venezuelan politician, educator and engineer currently serving as a deputy for the Popular Will party in the National Assembly. He is an outspoken critic of Nicolás Maduro and the United Socialist Party of Venezuela (PSUV). He was also a candidate for the Governor of Barinas state for the Democratic Unity Roundtable in 2017 election, which he lost to the pro-government candidate Argenis Chávez.

Poisoning and theft
On 23 February 2019, the same day as the Venezuelan opposition attempted to get humanitarian aid to Venezuela through the Colombia–Venezuela border, Superlano and his assistant were poisoned in Cúcuta, Colombia. His assistant and cousin, Carlos Salinas, subsequently died. The opposition asked for an investigation, without making "claims on who the culprits were".

U.S. Senator Marco Rubio called the poisoning a "grave situation". Maduro-aligned state media claimed Superlano and his assistant were poisoned by prostitutes.

In May 2019, Venezuelan Supreme Tribunal of Justice ordered the prosecution of several National Assembly members, including Freddy Superlano, for their actions during the failed uprising.

See also
 Venezuela Aid Live

References

1976 births
People from Barinas (state)
Democratic Action (Venezuela) politicians
Popular Will politicians
Members of the National Assembly (Venezuela)
Venezuelan engineers
Living people
People of the Crisis in Venezuela